Ferrol may refer to:

Places
 Ferrol (comarca), a coastal region in A Coruña, Galicia, Spain
 Ferrol, Spain, industrial city and naval station in Galicia, Spain
 Racing de Ferrol, an association football club
 Ferrol, Romblon, municipality in the Philippines
 Ferrol, Virginia, town in the United States of America
 Ferrol Island, an island of Peru

People
 Ferrol Sams (1922–2013), American physician and novelist

See also
 Ferrel (disambiguation)